(Latin for '[signed] with one's own hand'), abbreviated to m.p. or mppr.  or mppria is a phrase sometimes used at the end of typewritten or printed documents when there is no handwritten signature. It is typically found just after the name(s) of the person(s) who would have signed the document if it had not been printed or typewritten.

It is also found in several ancient documents in front of or after the writer's signature at the end of the document.

History
Medieval period
Richly decorated manu propria signs were frequently used by medieval dignitaries and literates to verify the authenticity of handwritten documents.

18th century
mppria was commonly used in the 18th century. However, it was not only used for Latin documents.

Full autograph title-page of Symphony no.97 by Joseph Haydn which reads 'Sinfonia in C/di me giuseppe Haydn mppria.  '
Nobility Diploma André Falquet

From the 19th century
Later, official documents were routinely accompanied with this abbreviation, for example the declaration of war on Serbia by Emperor Franz Joseph from 1914 ends with m.p.

Usage today

Ordinary personal cheques frequently include the abbreviation at the end of the signature line.

By country
Some of the countries that still regularly use manu propria include:
Albania in official documents: d.v.,
Austria: e. h.,
the Czech Republic: v. r. or occasionally the Latin abbreviation m.p.,
Germany: gez.
Hungary in official documents: s.k.,
Slovakia: v. r.,
Slovenia: l.r..
Serbia: s.r.

See also

List of Latin phrases
Seal
Tughra
Autopen

References

Latin literary phrases
Latin words and phrases
Authentication methods
Identity documents
Writing